IID may refer to:

 Interface Identifier, the last 64-bits of an IPv6 address
 Internet identity, a social identity used by Internet users
  Internet Identity, an Internet security company
 Ignition interlock device, a breathalyzer connected to a vehicle's engine
 Independent and identically distributed random variables in probability theory
 Interaural intensity difference in determining the location of a sound
 Internal Investigations Division (in law enforcement)
 IRIX Interactive Desktop, software for interacting with a computer running the IRIX operating system
 Iterative and Incremental Development in software development
 A COM Interface ID
 Invoke Image Display an Integrating the Healthcare Enterprise (IHE) Integration Profile
 Imperial Irrigation District
 IID (Imperial Institute of Design), a design school in Monteswar, West Bengal, India

See also
 2D (disambiguation), including a list of topics named II-D, etc.